Anupama Jain is a writer and teacher based out of Gurgaon, India. She is the founding member of Senior School Moms and a blogger. Anupama is the author of 4 well-received books and 12 anthologies across genres, one of which is a LIMCA record holder as India’s first Composite Novel.  She is an acclaimed community builder, mentor, and multi-award-winning blogger who pens on the vagaries of the quirky world across various coveted forums.

Background 
Anupama holds a MCA degree from Pune University, Pune, India. She lives in Gurgaon with her husband, son and daughter. Anupama also runs classes for children in Gurgaon.

Writer 

Anupama is a Contributing Author to Chronicles of Urban Nomads. She is the author of the novel, When Padma Bani Paula which was listed as one of five best books, fiction 2018 by readwriteinspire.com.

She also contributed to Crossed & Knotted, India’s first Composite Novel, 2016 that entered the LIMCA Book of Records. She also contributed to When They Spoke as well as Mock Stalk & Quarrel – all published by Readomania. In 2018, she contributed to When Women Speak Up an e-book of inspiring stories published by Women’s Web.

She has published multiple stories online, writes on parental forums and has won numerous prizes. She was the Runner-Up, Orange Flower 2017 Humour Award, and among the top 3, in 2016. Anupama was also the Finalist, Orange Flower 2017 Creative Writing Award.

She was listed as one of the 10 Indian women bloggers, a feminist must follow, by Women’s Web in July 2017. She was the winner of the Popular Choice Orange Flower Award for Humour, 2018, awarded by Women's Web. Her book was also listed as one of The Best books of 2018 by Read Write Inspire.

She is A-Z Blogging Challenge 2017, 2016 survivor. Her short story on marital morass was one of the top 14 blogs of 2017 out of the 18,000+ blogs published annually at mycity4kids.com.

She writes a regular piece at readomania.com – ‘AJ Wants to Know’ a satirical take on the quirky world around.

Anupama is the Founder & Admin, ' SeniorSchoolMoms' which won the Orange Flower Award 2021, for Best Facebook Groups.  SeniorSchoolMoms was one of the very few communities invited to join the first-ever WA cohort of Facebook Community Learning Labs for a super-exclusive program.  She is also the Head (Content & Collaborations) at Incredible Women Of India.

Books

Author

 When Padma Bani Paula, Published by Readomania (April 2018). When Padma Bani Paula, is listed as ‘One of the 5 best books of 2018 – Fiction’, by readwriteinspire.com. It is a breezy novel about second chances of life and the importance of staying true to one's roots. 
 Masala Mix: A Potpourri of Shorts, Published by Readomania (May 2020). This is a vibrant short story collection on myriad manifestations of love.
 Kings Saviours & Scoundrels -Timeless Tales from Katha Sarita Sagara’,  Winner, #BTBKidsFaveBookOfTheYear at BTBWordsmithsAwards2022. KSS is also listed as one of the best books of 2022 by @Wordsopedia. Rooted in the traditional storytelling of Indian legends, warriors, mythical beings, and their splendid adventures, Kings, Saviours & Scoundrels is a melting pot of entertaining Kathas, selected from one of India's oldest classics, Somadeva's Katha Sarita Sagara. These are Eternal Tales of India, Retold for the world.
 Tales from Katha Sarita Sagara: retold by  Anupama Jain, a collection of curated stories exemplifying core values of life. This has been made a supplementary read for middle graders of leading schools in multiple Indian cities.

Contributor

 Chronicles of Urban Nomads  - Published by Readomania on January 1, 2014
 Crossed & Knotted: India's First Composite Novel - Published by Readomania on February 9, 2015
 Mock, Stalk & Quarrel - Published by Readomania on January 1, 2016
 When They Spoke - Published by Readomania on January 1, 2016
 When Women Speak Up: A Women's Web Collection of inspiring stories - Published on December 27, 2017
 The Readomania Book of Horror - Published on May 31, 2020
 The Readomania Book of Folk Tales - Published on July 20, 2020
 The Readomania Book of Crime Thrillers - Published on July 26, 2020
 The Readomania Book of Romance - Published on August 17, 2020
 Better Parenting for the Children of Tomorrow: Secrets to Ace the Pandemic Times - Published on August 26, 2020
 An anthology of poems, titled 'Remnants of Loss', published by Readomania
 Fiction Anthology titled 'Songs of a Mermaid ( Tales of Urban Women) published by Chrysanthemum Chronicles

References 

21st-century Indian short story writers
Indian women short story writers
Living people
21st-century Indian women writers
Year of birth missing (living people)